Echinicola rosea  is a Gram-negative, rod-shaped, aerobic and halotolerant bacterium from the genus of Echinicola which has been isolated from water from the South China Sea.

References

External links
Type strain of Echinicola rosea at BacDive -  the Bacterial Diversity Metadatabase

Cytophagia
Bacteria described in 2016